Dorel Golan, an Israeli pianist.

She has studied with acclaimed pianists Daniel Gortler and Vadim Monastirsky. Golan completed her Masters studies with Prof. Arie Vardi at the Buchmann-Mehta Academy of Music in Tel Aviv.
Since 1992, she has been a recipient of the American-Israel Culture Foundation scholarship.
Golan has performed with some of the most important orchestras in the world, as well as with all the major orchestras in Israel including the Israeli Philharmonic Orchestra.

She appeared successfully in recitals at the Salle Cortot in Paris, at the Tivoli Hall in Copenhagen, at the Concertgebouw in Amsterdam, where she recorded her first CD. She also played in many other important centers.

Dorel played in various festivals, including the Klavier-Festival Ruhr in Germany. In 2006 she performed in the Israel Festival in Jerusalem.

Awards and prizes
 Israel America Culture Foundation award, since 1992
 First Prize – Marsala International Piano Competition in Italy, 1992
 First Best Young Pianist Prize Bremen International Piano Competition, 2001
 First Prize – Claremont Competition, 1996
 First Prize - Ariana Katz Competition, 1999
 First Prize - Ariana Katz Competition, 2006
 First Prize - Rubin Academy Competition, 2004 
 First Prize - Rubin Academy Competition, 2006

External links
 Le Festin dÉsope Op. 39, n° 12 by Alkan
 Klavierstücke, Op. 118, no. 6 by Brahms
 Etude "Pour les huit doigts" by Debussy 
 fastforward by Alexina Louie
 La Leggierezza by Liszt 
 Andante and variations in F minor, Hob.VII.6 by Hayden

Agency Europe: KulturMusikKonzepte 

Living people
Israeli classical pianists
Place of birth missing (living people)
Year of birth missing (living people)
Jewish classical pianists
Israeli women pianists
21st-century classical pianists
Women classical pianists
21st-century Israeli women musicians
20th-century classical pianists
20th-century Israeli women musicians
20th-century women pianists
21st-century women pianists